Bogus Basin Mountain Recreation Area is a ski area in Boise County, Idaho,  north-northeast of the city of Boise.

Bogus is operated by the Bogus Basin Recreation Association, a non-profit organization, on private and leased land in the Boise National Forest. Ski season generally runs from Thanksgiving weekend until the weekend preceding April 15, depending on snow conditions.

History
The area probably got its name during the 19th-century gold rush. Crooks in the hills above Boise City, known as "spelterers", would make bogus gold dust by heating lead filings with a bit of real gold dust.

Alf Engen, the father of the American powder technique, selected the site for the ski area at Bogus Basin in 1939. It opened to the public  in December 1942 with a  rope tow, and a  T-bar was installed in 1946. In the early 1950s, Bogus had a 30-meter Nordic ski jump, designed by Corey Engen, and his brother Sverre was Bogus' ski instructor.

The first chairlift at Bogus was installed in the fall of 1959 at Deer Point, and night skiing debuted in December 1964. The resort currently operates 7 chairlifts and 4 magic carpets. Four of the chairlifts are high-speed quads (#1 Deer Point, and #6 Pine Creek) were installed in 1996 and 1999, #3 Superior in 2011, and #2 Morning Star in 2019.

Bogus Basin has  of mixed runs, bowls, and glades, with  groomed. This back side of Shafer Butte was opened in January 1977, following the installation of Pine Creek (#6), a double chairlift, the previous summer. A fixed-grip double for 23 seasons, it became a high-speed quad in the summer of 1999.

The original double chairlift on #1 was installed in 1959 and upgraded in 1981. Showcase (#4), a double chairlift that had replaced a surface poma lift in 1972, is east of and parallel with the Deer Point Express. The original Deer Point lift was relocated and renamed Coach (#7) in 1996, servicing the beginner learning area. It honors Bill "Coach" Everts, an early area manager (1953–58) and longtime director.

From this Pioneer area, there is direct access to the gentle south-facing slopes served by a high speed quad chairlift, Morning Star (#2) and the north-facing slopes of the Bitterroot (#5), a double chair lift, which runs only on weekends and holidays. In addition, there is connecting trail access to the base of the Superior Express (#3) lift. It replaced a Riblet double chairlift built in 1965, and cut the ride time of the original lift in half. Night skiing was added to the Superior area with the installation of lights in the summer of 1986, and Morning Star was converted from a double to a triple chairlift in 1999.

Due to limited water resources, there is no significant snow making, only small portable units for patching. Three terrain parks are also available; two on the Deer Point mountain, one for advanced, the other for beginner to intermediate skill levels. The Sunshine Park is located on the Morning Star side of the mountain.

The main day lodge at Bogus Creek was built in 1962 and expanded in 1991; its ground floor contains the ticket office and ski lockers. In 2002 it was named for agribusiness magnate J. R. Simplot (1909–2008), because without him there might not be a Bogus Basin. When the fledgling ski area was struggling to pay its debts in 1953, Simplot bought its ski lifts and other mountain improvements from the Kingcliffe Co. and leased them back to the Bogus Basin Recreational Association for $1,500 per year for ten years. His intervention averted almost certain financial demise and won the everlasting gratitude of a generation of skiers. Simplot was later the driving force behind Brundage Mountain northwest of McCall, which opened in November 1961.

Chairlifts

 Bogus Basin has 7 chairlifts, and 4 magic carpets.

Other activities
The GoldRush Tubing Hill opened in the fall of 2003, constructed just west of the main parking lot for about $100,000. Annual revenues from the hill were expected to be four to five times that figure; revenues for its fourth season (2006–07) were just under $140,000.

The Glade Runner is a year-round operating mountain coaster that opened in November 2017. The base station was constructed a few yards from the J. R. Simplot Lodge, and the mountain coaster features  of track.

Other summer activities are available at Bogus, including hiking, mountain biking (no lift service), and a disc golf course. The disc golf course opened in July 2005, centered at the mid-mountain Pioneer Lodge; the upper area of chair 5 (Bitterroot) hosts the north nine, and the south nine is on the upper area of chair 2 (Morning Star).

Bogus Basin Road
Bogus is accessed by Bogus Basin Road (an extension of Harrison Boulevard), which twists  from the Boise city limits to the resort, only  NNE as the crow flies.

The two-lane road turns 172 times and gains  in elevation as the terrain changes from dry sagebrush foothills to snow-laden mountain forest. Originally a gravel road constructed by CCC crews (funded by the WPA) from 1938–40, Bogus Basin Road was first paved in 1962 and improved in 1998. Before its paving, it was a one-way road in ski season, with the direction changed to downhill in the early afternoon.

Season passes

In March 1998, Bogus' general manager Mike Shirley reduced the cost of an adult season pass from $500 to $199, lowering the break-even point to just seven visits (and kids' season passes fell to just $29). Bogus Basin sold nearly nine times as many passes for the 1998–99 season versus the previous year, halting the pass sales at 25,000 (2,854 for the 1997–98 season).

The new pricing strategy generated almost four times as much revenue (nearly $3.6 million) from season pass sales, all before June, six months before the season would begin. Total skier visits went from under 192,000 to over 303,000 (up 58%). Although the sales of day tickets ($31 each) expectedly fell (almost 50%), Bogus' total revenue increased by $2.6 million (up 55%) to $7.3 million for the 1998-99 ski season.

Shirley's deep-discount strategy was effective: resorts from coast to coast lowered their prices for multi-day, multi-area, and season passes. Locally, ski equipment sales increased significantly as skiers upgraded their gear.

The $199 price was in effect for fifteen years, until raised to $229 for the 2013–14 season.

Seniors (age 70 and over) skied for free at Bogus through March 2015; the policy was changed that summer. For the 2015–16 season, season passes for seniors were priced at $199 and one-day lift tickets at $44, a discount of ten dollars off the regular daily rate.

United States Ski Team
Members of the U.S. Ski Team from Bogus Basin include:
 Jeret Peterson – (1981–2011), freestyle aerials, 2005 World Cup champion, 2010 Olympic silver medalist
 Dane Spencer – (b. 1977) – giant slalom – currently a World Cup assistant coach with the U.S. Ski Team
 Erik Fisher – (b. 1985) – downhill
 Sandy Shellworth – (b. 1944) – 1968 Olympian, 21st in women's downhill, 1967 U.S. champion in giant slalom.
 Walt Falk – (b. 1947) – competed in downhill at 1966 World Championships
 Sara Studebaker – (b. 1984) – biathlon, 2010 & 2014 Olympian, 7th in 2014 women's team relay

General managers
After 21 seasons, Mike Shirley announced in February 2012 that he was stepping down as general manager and president, and was succeeded by Alan Moore, the former vice president of finance. Shirley was a former vice president with Morrison-Knudsen Co. and initially hired as an interim manager after the resignation of Terry Lofsvold in November 1991. After the search committee determined he was the best candidate, he was hired in April, the first general manager at Bogus with an extensive background in finance.

Moore stepped down in 2015 and was succeeded in November by Brad Wilson, formerly the general manager at Diamond Peak, Nevada, at northeast Lake Tahoe.

{| cellpadding="3" cellspacing="0" border="1" style="font-size: 100%; border: #aaa solid 1px; border-collapse: collapse;"
|- bgcolor="#eeeeee"
! GeneralManager !! SkiSeasons!! Years 
|-
|align="left"|Bill Everts, Jr.^
|align="center"|5
|align="center"|1953–1958
|-
|align="left"|Bob Loughery
|align="center"|26
|align="center"|1958–1984
|-
|align="left"|Terry Lofsvold
|align="center"|7
|align="center"|1984–1991
|-
|align="left"|Mike Shirley
|align="center"|21
|align="center"|1991–2012
|-
|align="left"|Alan Moore
|align="center"|3
|align="left"|2012–2015
|-
|align="left"|Brad Wilson
|align="center"|6th
|align="left"|2015–
|}
^ unpaid volunteer

References

External links

Idaho Public TV – Outdoor Idaho – "Hometown Ski Hills" – 2010 
You Tube – Bogus Basin videos
Ski Map.org – vintage maps – Bogus Basin
Idaho State Historical Society – vintage photos – Bogus Basin
Bogus Basin Ski Area Trail Map - Interactive Trail Map of Ski Runs and Lifts - Bogus Basin

Ski areas and resorts in Idaho
Buildings and structures in Boise County, Idaho
Tourist attractions in Boise County, Idaho